Mondo films are a subgenre of exploitation films and documentary films. Many mondo films are made in a way to resemble a pseudo-documentary and usually depicting sensational topics, scenes, or situations. Common traits of mondo films include portrayals of foreign cultures (which have drawn accusations of ethnocentrism or racism), an emphasis on taboo subjects such as death and sex, and staged sequences presented as genuine documentary footage. Over time, the films have placed increasing emphasis on footage of the dead and dying (both real and fake).

The term mondo is derived from the Italian word for "world".  The term shockumentary is also used to describe the genre.

Mondo films began to soar in popularity in the 1960s with the releases of Mondo Cane (1962), Women of the World (1963) and Africa Addio (1966). The genre arguably reached its peak with Faces of Death in 1978, a film that inspired myriad imitators, such as the Traces of Death series, Banned from Television, Death Scenes and Faces of Gore series.

History
Although earlier films such as Alessandro Blasetti's Europa di notte (Europe By Night, 1959) and Luigi Vanzi's Il mondo di notte (World By Night, 1961) may be considered examples of the genre, the origins of the mondo documentary are generally traced to the 1962 Italian film Mondo Cane (A Dog's World—a mild Italian profanity) by Paolo Cavara, Gualtiero Jacopetti and Franco Prosperi which was a commercial success.

Documentary films imitating Mondo Cane in the 1960s often included the term "mondo" in their titles, even if they were in English; examples include Mondo Bizarro, Mondo Daytona, Mondo Mod, Mondo Infame and Mondo Hollywood. Films outside the genre followed suit: Mondo Trasho, Mondo Weirdo: A Trip to Paranoia Paradise, Mondo Keyhole and Mondo Brutale (a German release of Wes Craven's The Last House on the Left) title themselves mondo, although none are mondo documentaries. Later in the decade, this naming convention began to fall out of favour and fewer mondo films identified themselves as such in their titles. The War Game, a 1965 British film depicting conditions before and after a nuclear attack on England, would not see public broadcast for twenty years. 

Filmmakers wanted to top each other in shock value to attract audiences. Cruelty to animals, accidents, tribal-initiation rites and surgeries are features of a typical mondo. Much of the action is staged, although the filmmakers may claim their goal is to document "reality". Subjects of mondo films include sex (Mondo Sex and Mondo Sexualis USA); celebrities (Mondo Elvis and Mondo Lugosi); youth culture (Mondo Teeno) and the gay subculture (Mondo Rocco).

Russ Meyer's film Mondo Topless was one of the few "documentaries" restricted to the old midnight movie circuit in the pre-VCR era; it explored strip clubs in 1960s San Francisco at a time when strip clubs were a novelty in the United States, restricted to centers of port-city decadence (such as San Francisco). Other examples of this genre include Mondo New York by Harvey Keith, Mondo di Notte by Gianni Proia and Mondo Balordo by Roberto Bianchi Montero. 

The 1980s saw a resurgence of mondo movies focusing almost exclusively on (onscreen) death, instead of world cultures. The Faces of Death series is a notable example of this type of mondo (or "death") movie. The producers used fake footage (passed off as real), but some of the footage was legitimate (including scenes of autopsies, suicides and accidents).

The rare 1985 film Mondo Senza Veli (World Without Veils or Mondo Fresh) was purported by viewers to feature at its end the brutal execution of a young Arab rapist by public rectal impalement. This episode was, however, believed to have been a staged execution by some viewers.

Mondo films in the 21st century feature gore, exemplified by the Faces of Gore and Traces of Death series. There is less fake footage, and many use news footage of accidents from East Asia.

The late 2010s saw another resurgence beginning with the Bootleg Death Tape series and Faces of Dying series from filmmaker Dustin Ferguson which both involved various independent Directors from around the world.

A number of films have parodied the genre. Examples include Ricardo Fratelli's Mondo Ford, Mr. Mike's Mondo Video by Saturday Night Lives Michael O'Donoghue, and Is There Sex After Death? by Jeanne and Alan Abel. Mondo Beyondo spoofed the films' approach to titling but was a parody of satellite television. The Italian cannibal film is arguably an offshoot of the mondo film.

Films 
The original mondo film series was the Mondo Cane series by Gualtiero Jacopetti, Paolo Cavara, and Franco Prosperi. When this type of film proved successful, many imitators followed.

The pair's Mondo candido (1975) is not a "Mondo" film; the title was imposed on them by the studio, who wished to cash in on their earlier successes. The film is a retelling of Voltaire's novel, Candide.

In the late 1980s Stelvio Massi (a.k.a. Max Steele) made two spinoffs of the original Mondo Cane series, known as Mondo Cane 3 and Mondo Cane 4 on video.

In 1969, brothers Angelo and Alfredo Castiglioni began to make a series of their own mondo films until the early 1980s. They made five films in all, tying Jacopetti and Prosperi as the most prolific mondo film producers. Each film examines brutal and bizarre behavior on the African continent. Their films are considered some of the most graphic Mondo films ever made.

Antonio Climati, cinematographer to Prosperi and Jacopetti in many mondo films, joined Mario Morra in 1974 to produce their own string of mondo films, known as the Savage Trilogy. Prosperi also produced the films. Climati and Morra were known for staging scenes.

The 1978 Faces of Death popularized a Mondo style known as "death films", which depicted humans or animals dying in graphic ways.

Uwe Schier bought the rights to the Mondo Cane and Faces of Death films and released his own entries in both series, consisting largely of footage lifted from other mondo films. Faces of Death 5 draws heavily on Death Scenes; Faces of Death 6 consists almost entirely of Days of Fury and Mondo Cane IV (not to be confused with Mondo Cane 2000, l'Incredibile, Schier's Mondo Cane IV is in fact the fifth film in the series) lifts from other films (including Death Scenes and Death Faces IV). In 1993, Hurricane Pictures edited a mix of scenes featured in Addio ultimo uomo and Shocking Africa, labeling it the "fifth chapter" of the saga (Teil V in German).
 

Several imitators followed the Faces of Death series; many used (or were composed entirely of) footage from other mondo films.

See also 
 Shocking Asia
 Snuff film
 Goona-goona epic

References

Bibliography 
 RE/Search No. 10: Incredibly Strange Films: A Guide to Deviant Films. RE/Search Publications 1986, 
 Brottman, Mikita: Mondo Horror. Carnivalizing the Taboo. In: Prince, Stephen (ed.) 2004: The horror film. S. 167–188. New Brunswick: Rutgers University Press. .
 Goodall, Mark 2006: Sweet & Savage. The World Through the Shockumentary Film Lens. London: Headpress. . (the standard work on the mondo and cannibal genre)
 Goodall, Mark 2006: Shockumentary Evidence. The perverse politics of the Mondo film. In: Dennison, Stephanie (Hg.) 2006: Remapping world cinema. Identity, culture and politics in film. S. 118–128. London: Wallflower. .
 Kerekes, David; Slater, David 2006: Killing for culture. Death film from Shockumentaries to snuff. Manchester: Headpress. .
 Stefano Loparco, 'Gualtiero Jacopetti - Graffi sul mondo'. The first complete biography dedicated to the co-director of 'Mondo cane'. Il Foglio Letterario, 2014 - 
 Shipka, Danny 2011: Perverse titillation. The exploitation cinema of Italy, Spain and France, 1960-1980. Jefferson: Mcfarland. .

External links
Fanzine about Italian Mondo Movies https://www.instagram.com/tv/CicUxVrAjLW/?igshid=YmMyMTA2M2Y=
 Italian Mondo Movies collection '50s- '70s, https://www.spazioeimmagini.com/italian-mondo-movies-50s-70s, Spazio e Immagini.
Exhibition AI LIMITI DEL MONDO.
Original vintage photos and documents from the Italian Mondo Movies '58 '74,https://www.spazioeimmagini.com/exhibitions-2022, Spazio e Immagini.
 Vomit Bag Video
 Mondo / Death
 The Internet Mondo Movie Database (ImMDB)

Film genres
 
Documentary film genres